Andra Raynard Davis [pronounced André] (born December 23, 1978) is a former American football linebacker who played ten seasons in the National Football League (NFL). He played college football for the University of Florida and was drafted by the Cleveland Browns in the fifth round of the 2002 NFL Draft. He also played for the Denver Broncos and Buffalo Bills.

Early years
Davis was born in Live Oak, Florida in 1978.  He attended Suwannee High School in Live Oak, where he was a four-year starter for the Suwannee Bulldogs high school football team.  As a senior in 1996, Davis was the team captain for the Suwannee Bulldogs football and basketball teams, and was recognized as a first-team Florida Class 4A all-state selection and a SuperPrep high school All-American in football.

College career
Davis accepted an athletic scholarship to attend the University of Florida in Gainesville, Florida, where he played for coach Steve Spurrier's Florida Gators football team from 1998 to 2001.  The Gators coaching staff decided to red-shirt him as a true freshman in 1997.  As a junior in 2000, Davis was a member of the Gators' Southeastern Conference (SEC) championship team.  As a senior team captain in 2001, he was recognized as a first-team All-SEC selection and a second-team All-American.  During his college career, he played in thirty-five games, and started twenty-three of them; he finished his career with 232 tackles, five quarterback sacks and four forced fumbles, three of which were recovered.

Professional career

Cleveland Browns
Cleveland also selected André Davis in second round of the 2002 draft, requiring the linebacker to have his full name on the back of his jersey for his first three seasons. He made his NFL debut versus the Kansas City Chiefs on September 8, 2002. He finished his rookie season with 24 tackles and one interception.

Davis became the Browns starting middle linebacker in 2003 and finished the season leading the team with 171 tackles.  He also tied a franchise record with 4 sacks in a single game that year against Kansas City on November 9, 2003. During the 2004 season he missed the final five games of the season with a knee injury, he finished the season with 89 tackles and three interceptions.

In 2005 Davis recorded a career high and team leading 199 tackles. His best game came against the Green Bay Packers on September 18 when he recorded 20 tackles. On November 20 he was named the AFC Defensive Player of the week after recording 14 tackles, 2 tfl and 2 pbu's in the 22-0 win over the Miami Dolphins. On December 15, 2005 the Browns gave him a five-year contract extension.

During the 2006 season Davis played in 14 games, finishing with 104 tackles, one sack and two interceptions. During the 2007 season he struggled starting only 10 of 16 games, finishing with only 67 tackles.

After the 2008 season, Davis became a free agent.  He finished his seven seasons with the Browns starting 83 of 105 games, recording 711 tackles (484 unassisted), 8.5 sacks, and 8 interceptions.

After football Davis went on to attain his MBA degree in 2016.

Denver Broncos
On February 28, 2009, Davis signed a two-year contract with the Denver Broncos.  They released him on March 11, 2010.  In his single season with the Broncos, he started 13 of 16 games, recording 90 tackles and 3.5 sacks.

Buffalo Bills
Davis signed a two-year contract with the Buffalo Bills on March 16, 2010.  During the  season, he saw action in six games and started four of them. After appearing in sixteen games for the Bills during , he became a free agent following the season.

See also

 2001 College Football All-America Team
 History of the Cleveland Browns
 List of Buffalo Bills players
 List of Florida Gators football All-Americans
 List of Florida Gators in the NFL Draft

References

Bibliography
 Carlson, Norm, University of Florida Football Vault: The History of the Florida Gators, Whitman Publishing, LLC, Atlanta, Georgia (2007).  .
 Golenbock, Peter, Go Gators!  An Oral History of Florida's Pursuit of Gridiron Glory, Legends Publishing, LLC, St. Petersburg, Florida (2002).  .
 Hairston, Jack, Tales from the Gator Swamp: A Collection of the Greatest Gator Stories Ever Told, Sports Publishing, LLC, Champaign, Illinois (2002).  .
 McCarthy, Kevin M.,  Fightin' Gators: A History of University of Florida Football, Arcadia Publishing, Mount Pleasant, South Carolina (2000).  .

External links
  Andra Davis – Florida Gators player profile
  Andra Davis – National Football League player profile

1978 births
Living people
American football linebackers
Buffalo Bills players
Cleveland Browns players
Denver Broncos players
Florida Gators football players
People from Live Oak, Florida
Players of American football from Florida
Ed Block Courage Award recipients